This is a list of airports in Georgia, grouped by type and sorted by location.

Georgia is a sovereign state in the Caucasus region of Eurasia. It is bounded to the west by the Black Sea, to the north by Russia, to the south by Turkey and Armenia, and to the east by Azerbaijan.

The country is divided into nine regions, two autonomous republics, and the capital city of Tbilisi.



Passenger statistics 

Georgian airports with number of passengers served in 2014, 2015, 2016, 2017, 2018, 2019, 2020, 2021, 2022:

Airports 

Airport names shown in bold have scheduled passenger service on commercial airlines.

Adjara is an autonomous republic of Georgia.
Abkhazia is a de facto independent state, and functions as such since the 1992-93 war. However, the vast majority of the international community consider it to be a part of Georgia, legally governed by the de jure Government of the Autonomous Republic of Abkhazia, even though Georgia has no control over it. (see also; International recognition of Abkhazia and South Ossetia).

See also 

 Georgian Air Force and Abkhazian Air Force
 Transport in Georgia
 List of airports by ICAO code: U#UG - Georgia

References

 
 
  - includes IATA codes
  - ICAO codes, coordinates
  - IATA and ICAO codes

 
Georgia (country)
Airports
Airports
Georgia
Georgia